Glaucocharis chrysochyta is a species of moth in the family Crambidae. It is endemic to New Zealand. This species was first described by Edward Meyrick in 1882. The binomial of this species is occasionally misspelt as G. chrysoclyta.

References

Diptychophorini
Moths of New Zealand
Moths described in 1882
Endemic fauna of New Zealand
Taxa named by Edward Meyrick
Endemic moths of New Zealand